Dingilizwe Dumile (August 3, 1973 – April 23, 1993), known professionally as DJ Subroc, was an American hip-hop artist and a member of KMD and Constipated Monkeys.

Biography
Dumile was born on August 3, 1973 at Nassau County Medical Center in Long Island, and was "raised primarily in Long Beach, NY."

Career
Dumile's first group, KMD was formed by him and his brother Zev Love X, who would later be known as MF DOOM, along with Jade 1, who would later be known as Rodan, but who was eventually replaced by Onyx the Birthstone Kid. Their first release was the LP Mr. Hood, released by Elektra Records, in 1991. 

KMD also did further production for artists like 3rd Bass, MF Grimm, Megalon (aka Tommy Gunn), and Kurious Jorge.

Death

DJ Subroc died on April 23, 1993, after being hit by a car while attempting to cross the Nassau Expressway. His death brought production of the KMD album Black Bastards to a halt and marked the end of KMD, although Black Bastards was later released.

Legacy
MF Doom dedicated his 2004 track "Kon Karne" to his late brother with the lyric, "I dedicate this mix to Subroc, the hip-hop Hendrix". A Tribe Called Quest shouted out DJ Subroc in their song "8 Million Stories", and the Kurious track "Leave Ya' with This" from the album A Constipated Monkey is also dedicated to him.

References

External links 
Review of ''Black Bastards
DJ Subroc's Myspace
Subroc's Discogs Page

1973 births
1993 deaths
Road incident deaths in New York (state)
Pedestrian road incident deaths
American hip hop DJs
20th-century American musicians
20th-century American male musicians